Toloke is a village in Wallis and Futuna. It is located in Sigave District on the northwestern tip of Futuna Island. Its population according to the 2018 census was 172 people.

References

Populated places in Wallis and Futuna